Gouverneur Kemble Warren (January 8, 1830 – August 8, 1882) was an American civil engineer and United States Army general during the American Civil War. He is best remembered for arranging the last-minute defense of Little Round Top during the Battle of Gettysburg and is often referred to as the "Hero of Little Round Top". His subsequent service as a corps commander and his remaining military career were ruined during the Battle of Five Forks, when he was relieved of command of the V Corps by Philip Sheridan, who claimed that Warren had moved too slowly.

Early life
Warren was born in Cold Spring, New York, and named for Gouverneur Kemble, a prominent local Congressman, diplomat, industrialist, and owner of the West Point Foundry. His sister, Emily Warren Roebling, would later play a significant role in building the Brooklyn Bridge. He entered the United States Military Academy across the Hudson River from his hometown at age 16 and graduated second in his class of 44 cadets in 1850. He was commissioned a brevet second lieutenant in the Corps of Topographical Engineers.

In the Antebellum South, he worked on the Mississippi River, participating in the Pacific Railroad Surveys of possible transcontinental railroad routes, and, in 1857, mapping the Western United States, extensively exploring the vast Nebraska Territory, including Nebraska, North Dakota, South Dakota, part of Montana, and part of Wyoming. He served as the engineer on William S. Harney's Battle of Ash Hollow in the Nebraska Territory in 1855, where he saw his first combat.

One region he surveyed was the Minnesota River Valley, a valley much larger than expected from the low-flow Minnesota River. In some places, the valley is 5 miles (8 km) wide and 250 feet (80 m) deep. Warren first explained the region's hydrology in 1868, attributing the gorge to a massive river that drained Lake Agassiz between 11,700 and 9,400 years ago. The great river was named Glacial River Warren in his honor after his death.

American Civil War
At the start of the war, Warren was a first lieutenant and mathematics instructor at the United States Military Academy. He helped raise a local regiment for service in the U.S. Army and was appointed lieutenant colonel of the 5th New York Infantry Regiment on May 14, 1861. Warren and his regiment saw their first combat at the Battle of Big Bethel in Virginia on June 10, arguably the first major land engagement of the war. He was promoted to colonel and regimental commander on September 10.

In the 1862 Peninsula Campaign, Warren commanded his regiment at the Siege of Yorktown and also assisted the chief topographical engineer of the Army of the Potomac, Brig. Gen. Andrew A. Humphreys, by leading reconnaissance missions and drawing detailed maps of appropriate routes for the army in its advance up the Virginia Peninsula. He commanded a small brigade (3rd Brigade, 2nd Division, V Corps) during the Seven Days Battles consisting of his own 5th New York along with the 10th New York. At Gaines Mill, he was bruised in the knee by a shell fragment but remained on the field. He continued to lead the brigade at the Second Battle of Bull Run, suffering heavy casualties in a heroic stand against an overwhelming enemy assault, and at Antietam, where the V Corps was in reserve and saw no combat.

Warren was promoted to brigadier general on September 26, 1862, and he and his brigade went to the Battle of Fredericksburg in December, but again were held in reserve and saw no action. When U.S. Maj. Gen. Joseph Hooker reorganized the Army of the Potomac in February 1863, he named Warren his chief topographical engineer and then chief engineer. As chief engineer, Warren was commended for his service in the Battle of Chancellorsville.

At the start of the Gettysburg Campaign, as Confederate General Robert E. Lee began his invasion of Pennsylvania, Warren advised Hooker on the routes the Army should take in pursuit. On the second day of the Battle of Gettysburg, July 2, 1863, Warren initiated the defense of Little Round Top, recognizing the importance of the undefended position on the left flank of the U.S. Army and directing, on his initiative, the brigade of Col. Strong Vincent to occupy it just minutes before it was attacked. Warren suffered a minor neck wound during the Confederate assault.

Promoted to major general after Gettysburg (August 8, 1863), Warren commanded the II Corps from August 1863 until March 1864, replacing the wounded Maj. Gen. Winfield S. Hancock, and distinguishing himself at the Battle of Bristoe Station. On March 13, 1865, he was brevetted to major general in the regular army for his actions at Bristoe Station. During the Mine Run Campaign, Warren's corps was ordered to attack Lee's army. Still, he perceived that a trap had been laid and refused the order from army commander Maj. Gen. George G. Meade. Although initially angry at Warren, Meade acknowledged that he had been right. Upon Hancock's return from medical leave and the spring 1864 reorganization of the Army of the Potomac, Warren assumed command of the V Corps and led it through the Overland Campaign, the Siege of Petersburg, and the Appomattox Campaign.

During these Virginia campaigns, Warren established a reputation for bringing his engineering traits of deliberation and caution to the role of an infantry corps commander. He won the Battle of Globe Tavern, August 18 to August 20, 1864, cutting the Weldon Railroad, a vital supply route north to Petersburg. He also won a limited success in the Battle of Peebles' Farm in September 1864, carrying a part of the Confederate lines protecting supplies moving to Petersburg on the Boydton Plank Road.

The aggressive Maj. Gen. Philip Sheridan, a key subordinate of Lt. Gen. Ulysses S. Grant, was dissatisfied with Warren's performance. He was angry at Warren's corps for supposedly obstructing roads after the Battle of the Wilderness and its cautious actions during the Siege of Petersburg. At the beginning of the Appomattox Campaign, Sheridan requested that the VI Corps be assigned to his pursuit of Lee's army. Still, Grant insisted that the V Corps was better positioned. He gave Sheridan written permission to relieve Warren if he felt it was justified "for the good of the service". Grant later wrote in his Personal Memoirs,

At the Battle of Five Forks on April 1, 1865, Sheridan judged that the V Corps had moved too slowly into the attack and criticized Warren fiercely for not being at the front of his columns. Warren had been held up, searching for Samuel W. Crawford's division, which had gone astray in the woods. But overall, he had handled his corps efficiently, and their attack had carried the day at Five Forks, arguably the pivotal battle of the final days. Nevertheless, Sheridan relieved Warren of command on the spot. He was assigned to the defenses of Petersburg and then briefly to command of the Department of Mississippi.

Post-war
Humiliated by Sheridan, Warren resigned his commission as major general of volunteers in protest on May 27, 1865, reverting to his permanent rank as major in the United States Army Corps of Engineers. He served as an engineer for 17 years, building railroads with assignments along the Mississippi River, achieving the rank of lieutenant colonel in 1879. But the career that had shown so much promise at Gettysburg was ruined. He urgently requested a court of inquiry to exonerate him from the stigma of Sheridan's action. Numerous requests were ignored or refused until Ulysses S. Grant retired from the presidency. President Rutherford B. Hayes ordered a court of inquiry that convened in 1879. After hearing testimony from dozens of witnesses over 100 days, the court found that Sheridan's relief of Warren had been unjustified. On November 21, 1881, President Chester Alan Arthur directed that the findings be published; no other action was taken. Unfortunately for Warren, these results were not published until after his death.

In 1867, he was elected as a member of the American Philosophical Society.

Warren's last assignment in the Army was as district engineer for Newport, Rhode Island, where he died of complications from diabetes on August 8, 1882. He was buried in the Island Cemetery in Newport in civilian clothes and without military honors at his request. His last words were, "The flag! The flag!"

Legacy
A bronze statue of Warren stands on Little Round Top in Gettysburg National Military Park. It was created by Karl Gerhardt (1853–1940) and dedicated in 1888. Another bronze statue, by Henry Baerer (1837–1908), was erected in the Grand Army Plaza, Brooklyn, New York. It depicts Warren standing in uniform, with field binoculars on a granite pedestal made of stone quarried at Little Round Top.

Reflecting a pattern of naming many Washington, DC streets in newly developed areas in the Capital after Civil War generals, an east–west street in the Northwest quadrant is named Warren Street, NW.

The United States Army Transport  was named for Warren.

The G. K. Warren Prize is awarded approximately every four years by the United States National Academy of Sciences. It is funded by a gift from his daughter, Miss Emily B. Warren, in memory of her father.

Mount Warren in California is named in his honor.

See also

 List of American Civil War generals (Union)

Notes

References
 Eicher, John H., and David J. Eicher. Civil War High Commands. Stanford, CA: Stanford University Press, 2001. .
 Grant, Ulysses S. Personal Memoirs of U. S. Grant. 2 vols. Charles L. Webster & Company, 1885–86. .
 Heidler, David S., and Jeanne T. Heidler. "Gouverneur Kemble Warren." In Encyclopedia of the American Civil War: A Political, Social, and Military History, edited by David S. Heidler and Jeanne T. Heidler. New York: W. W. Norton & Company, 2000. .
 Warner, Ezra J. Generals in Blue: Lives of the Union Commanders. Baton Rouge: Louisiana State University Press, 1964. .
 Wittenberg, Eric J. Little Phil: A Reassessment of the Civil War Leadership of Gen. Philip H. Sheridan. Washington, DC: Potomac Books, 2002. .

Further reading
 Jordan, David M. "Happiness Is Not My Companion": The Life of General G. K. Warren. Bloomington: Indiana University Press, 2001. .

External links

 
 
 
 

1830 births
1882 deaths
People of New York (state) in the American Civil War
United States Army Corps of Topographical Engineers
United States Military Academy alumni
Union Army generals
People from Cold Spring, New York
American civil engineers
Burials in Rhode Island
Engineers from New York (state)
Members of the United States National Academy of Sciences